Nenu Saitham is a 2004 Indian Telugu film starring Madala Ravi and Gurleen Chopra. Veteran actors like Madala Ranga Rao, Chandra Mohan, Jayaprakash Reddy, Pragathi and Jeeva play supporting roles. The film was directed by Dhavala Satyam  and produced and acted by Madala Ravi in the  lead role on Bharat Productions. Music is composed by TVS Raju. The film was a flop. The film's title is based on the song "Nenu Saitham" from Tagore.

Cast
Madala Ravi
Gurleen Chopra
Madala Ranga Rao
Jayaprakash Reddy as Minister
Chandra Mohan
Telangana Shakuntala
Jeeva
Pragathi
Narra Venkateswara Rao

Reception
The film received positive reviews.

Soundtrack

Music composed by TVS Raju. Music acquired by Lahari Music Company.

References 

2000s Telugu-language films